"Valged ööd" ("White Nights") is the fourth single by Estonian singer Getter Jaani, which is released by the Estonian record label Moonwalk. It features vocals from Koit Toome. "Valged ööd" was released on the May 22, 2011 as a Digital download. The single was taken from Getter Jaani's  second album Rockefeller Street.

Track listing

Charts

Release history

References

2011 singles
2011 songs
Getter Jaani songs
Songs written by Sven Lõhmus
Koit Toome songs